Osieczek may refer to the following places:
Osieczek, Inowrocław County in Kuyavian-Pomeranian Voivodeship (north-central Poland)
Osieczek, Wąbrzeźno County in Kuyavian-Pomeranian Voivodeship (north-central Poland)
Osieczek, Masovian Voivodeship (east-central Poland)
Osieczek, Lubusz Voivodeship (west Poland)